Hu Xiaolian (born May 1958) is a Chinese economist and the Deputy Governor of the People's Bank of China since July 2009 and the former director of the State Administration of Foreign Exchange in China. She was ranked 23rd on The Wall Street Journals "The 50 Women to Watch 2007" list. She was ranked fourth on The Wall Street Journals "The 50 Women to Watch 2008" list and was referred to as "one of the most powerful people in the world".

Hu was elected an alternate member of the CCP Central Committee at the November 2012 18th National Party Congress.

Biography
Born in Hubei in 1958, Hu graduated from the Graduate School of the People's Bank of China with an MA in economics in 1984. Hu served as Director of the State Administration of Foreign Exchange from 2007–2009. In 2009, she was appointed Deputy Governor of the People's Bank of China.

She is also an adviser to the China Finance 40 Forum (CF40).

In February 2015, Hu was elected as the Chairwoman and Party Secretary of the Exim Bank of China.

References

1958 births
Living people
Officials of the People's Bank of China
People's Republic of China politicians from Hubei
Chinese Communist Party politicians from Hubei
Politicians from Suizhou
Recipients of Hilal-i-Quaid-i-Azam